Pietro Righetti (4 January 1899 – 9 October 2001) was an Italian racing cyclist. He rode in the 1928 Tour de France.

See also
 List of centenarians (sportspeople)

References

External links
 

1899 births
2001 deaths
Italian male cyclists
Italian centenarians
Place of birth missing
Men centenarians
Sportspeople from the Province of La Spezia
Cyclists from Liguria